Hyeonchungno Station is a station of Daegu Metro Line 1 in Nam-gu, Daegu, South Korea.

Passengers by year

References

External links

 Cyber station information from Daegu Metropolitan Transit Corporation

Nam District, Daegu
Railway stations opened in 1997
Daegu Metro stations